Hitachi-LG Data Storage (HLDS, HL-DT-ST or H-L Data Storage), a joint venture between Hitachi and LG, is a manufacturer of DVD and Blu-ray optical disk drives for desktop and notebook computers. Founded in late 2000, the company began operation in January 2001, and shipped its first product in the summer of that year. In 2006, HLDS began developing Blu-ray Disc drives. The company claims that it has led the disk drive industry in market share since its founding, with a 20% share for fiscal year 2001, 29% for fiscal year 2012, and 60% for fiscal year 2016. From 2015 to 2017, the company began to manufacture wireless chargers, sensors and head mounted displays for virtual reality, as ODD sales dwindled.

References

External links

 
 List of HL-DT-ST optical drive models – CDR Info

Manufacturing companies based in Seoul
Japanese companies established in 2000
South Korean companies established in 2000
Computer companies established in 2000
Computer storage companies
Electronics companies of Japan
Electronics companies of South Korea
Hitachi
LG Corporation
Multinational joint-venture companies
Optical computer storage